Harold Dougald Prescott (October 18, 1920 – May 1, 2002) was a professional American football player who played wide receiver for four seasons for the Green Bay Packers, Philadelphia Eagles, Detroit Lions, and New York Yanks.

References

External links

1920 births
2002 deaths
American football wide receivers
Green Bay Packers players
Philadelphia Eagles players
Detroit Lions players
New York Yanks players
Hardin–Simmons Cowboys football players
People from Abilene, Texas
People from Cisco, Texas
Players of American football from Texas